

Nebulous Beginning
In 1973 the NCAA changed its classification system to a numerical method. Schools were reclassified in three separate divisions with Division III being the lowest. The former College Division teams were mostly slotted into Division II despite a majority coming from D-III schools. Because the NCAA did not hold a national tournament for either D-II or D-III at the time there was no need to have a formal delineation between the two lower divisions, however, ECAC 3 had already been formed out of schools from ECAC 2 in order to allow them to participate in a more balanced conference. While there was no formal classification of ECAC 3 as a D-III conference until much later, the teams in ECAC 3 and the independents who later joined the conference are sometimes regarded as NCAA Division III programs during the first decade of play.

Tournament Play Begins
In 1983 the NCAA announced they would hold an NCAA Division III Championship for the upcoming season. While most of the teams that were eligible for tournament continued to play at the Division II level, they submitted bids for the new championship at the end of the season. Due to the level of interest the tournament was founded as an 8-team championship with no automatic bids being offered. Prior to the tournament, because no conference championships were yet held for western teams, an 8-team qualifying tournament was held instead to determine which teams would receive bids to the national tournament. The regional tournament was discontinued after 1985 when the western conferences began their league playoffs.

Because the Division III level was skewed towards eastern teams, that region received more bids than the western teams for the first three years. Afterwards, both the eastern and western regions received 4 bids each.

Increased Participation
In 1994 the NESCAC, the primary conference for several eastern teams, announced that they were rescinding their policy barring member schools from participating in national tournaments. Their new policy, however, restricted members to only one postseason tournament. Because of that, some ECAC East schools had to decide whether or not they would participate in their conference tournament or sit out and hope that the selection committee would choose to offer them a bid. Williams was the first teams to take the gamble in 1994, but they did not receive a bid. The following year Middlebury sat out the ECAC East Tournament and received a bid. This began a five-year run for the Panthers as NCAA champions, the longest unbroken streak for a champion at any level of college hockey.

Tournament Expansion and Exclusion
In 1999 the NCAA announced a plan to begin offering automatic bids for the Division III NCAA tournament. As part of this new policy, they would only offer bids to conference tournament champions of eligible Division III leagues. To qualify, none of the postseason participants could be ranked above Division III and the conference must have at least 7 members playing during the season. This caused several changes to college hockey, including the NESCAC sponsoring ice hockey as a sport for the first time and the termination of its policy restricting member teams to only one postseason tournament.

Due to five eastern conferences and two western conferences qualifying, the NCAA also abandoned its policy of having an equal number of eastern and western teams participate in the tournament. One at-large bid would be offered to the non-league champion with the best record but, after two years, the tournament was expanded to 9 teams with a second at-large bid included so that each region could provide an additional team. A further at-large bid was added in 2006 which could go to either region. The tournament was expanded to 11 teams in 2009 with an additional at-large bid which was converted into an automatic qualifier once the MCHA met NCAA regulations in 2010.

Conference realignment and dissolution
In 2009 the MASCAC began sponsoring ice hockey for the first time. The 5 member schools, along with 2 associate members, formed the league's new ice hockey division but despite meeting the NCAA's requirements for an automatic bid, the conference didn't receive one until 2012. The following year, 2013, the WIAC began sponsoring ice hockey for the first time. As a result all 5 member schools that fielded teams left the NCHA. The NCHA responded by absorbing all members of the MCHA in order to retain its automatic qualifier. Due to the WIAC not having enough members the conference champion did not receive an automatic qualifier, bringing the number of at-large bids back to 4 since the MCHA no longer existed.

In 2017 the NCAA increased the number of tournament participants to 12 and offered the additional bid to one conference tournament champion whose league did not meet the minimum NCAA membership requirement. This bid was later given to the UCHC champion.

Conference timeline

See also
List of NCAA Division III men's ice hockey champions

References

External links
USCHO.com

 
Seasons, men